Raymond Michael Brooks (born 20 April 1939) is an English television and film actor.

Early work
Ray Brooks was born in Brighton, Sussex, and began as a television actor. He appeared in the long-running ITV soap Coronation Street in 1964 as Norman Phillips. He played Terry Mills in the series Taxi! with Sid James (1963). He played small roles in British films such as H.M.S. Defiant, Play It Cool and Some People.

He rose to prominence in the UK after starring alongside Michael Crawford and Rita Tushingham in the 1965 film The Knack …and How to Get It. The film, directed by Richard Lester, won the Palme d'Or at the Cannes Film Festival in 1965. Brooks followed up this success starring in the ground-breaking 1966 television drama Cathy Come Home.

In an interview with Sussex Life, Brooks recalled-

Through the 1960s, he also had small roles in a number of other cult television series: including The Avengers, Danger Man, "Randall and Hopkirk (Deceased)" and Doomwatch.  He played the major role of David Campbell in the Doctor Who film Daleks' Invasion Earth 2150 A.D.. 

Major film roles in the 1970s were less numerous.  These included roles in The Last Grenade (1970), the all-star Alice's Adventures in Wonderland, and in Carry On Abroad (1972) as oversexed waiter Giorgio. He also appeared in a number of Pete Walker films including The Flesh and Blood Show, Tiffany Jones and House of Whipcord.  In this decade Ray released an album of his own songs, and built a successful career doing voiceovers for television advertisements, and children's television series Mr Benn.

The 1980s and 1990s
Brooks returned to prominence with the BBC comedy drama Big Deal (1984–1986), in which he co-starred with Sharon Duce.  After Big Deal ended, Duce and Brooks starred together, as different characters, in the popular Growing Pains (1992) about a pair of middle-aged foster parents.

Brooks was also the narrator of the well known children's animations by David McKee: Mr Benn and King Rollo.  From 1980 to 1985, he played Detective Sergeant Dave Brook on BBC Radio 4 (later on BBC Radio 2) in four series of Detective written by Robert Barr, and subsequently repeated on BBC Radio 4 Extra from 2013. Brooks starred in the Edward Boyd thriller, Castles in Spain, on BBC Radio 4 in 1987.

In 1987, the BBC chose Brooks as one of the principal character voices for the acclaimed French animated science fiction film Les Maîtres du temps, which the BBC had co-produced in 1982.

The 2000s and 2010s
Brooks was the original 'next stop' announcement voice of the Tramlink system, before being replaced by Nicholas Owen.

In 2002, he acted in BBC drama Two Thousand Acres of Sky. He joined the cast of the long-running BBC soap opera EastEnders as Joe Macer in 2005. On 30 September 2006, it was announced that Brooks' EastEnders character would depart in January 2007 following the departure of Joe's wife, Pauline Fowler (Wendy Richard), at Christmas.  His final appearance was on 26 January when his character confessed to killing Pauline, before falling from a window to his death.

He starred as Detective Sergeant Brook in the BBC Radio 2 police series: Robert Barr - Detective; series 1: 13 episodes, series 2: 10 episodes, series 3: 8 episodes and series 4:8 episodes (1980 to 1985). These have been re-broadcast on BBC Radio 4 Extra since 2013. The series is written by Robert Barr.

Filmography

Captured (1959)
H.M.S. Defiant (1962) as Hayes
Play It Cool (1962) as Freddy
Some People (1962) as Johnnie
The Knack …and How to Get It (1965) as Tolen
Daleks' Invasion Earth 2150 A.D. (1966) as David
Cathy Come Home (1966) as Reg Ward
The Last Grenade (1970) as Lt. David Coulson
The Flesh and Blood Show (1972) as Mike
Alice's Adventures in Wonderland (1972) as 5 of Spades
Carry On Abroad (1972) as Georgio
Tiffany Jones (1973) as Guy
Assassin (1973) as Edward Craig
House of Whipcord (1974) as Tony

References

External links
www.RayBrooksBooks.com — Ray Brooks official website
Ray Brooks interview — by Chris Hunt, 1986, discussing his films of the 1960s
Ray Brooks interview — at Best British TV

 - episode guide for the Robert Barr - Detective radio series

1939 births
Living people
Male actors from Brighton
Male actors from Sussex
English male film actors
English male soap opera actors
English male voice actors